Vilyuy may refer to:
Vilyuy, a river in Siberia, Russia
Vilyuy Plateau
Vilyuy Dam
Vilyuy District
Vilyuy Lowland
Vilyuy Syneclise
Ust-Vilyuy Range

See also
Vilyuysk (disambiguation)